Ogcodinae is a subfamily of the Acroceridae (small-headed flies). Their larvae are endoparasites of araneomorph spiders in the subgroup Entelegynae.

Genera
The subfamily includes one extant genus and one extinct:
 †Glaesoncodes Hennig, 1968
 Ogcodes Latreille, 1796

References

Acroceridae
Brachycera subfamilies
Endoparasites